Francis Clarke may refer to:

 Francis Clarke (politician) (1857–1939), Australian politician
 Francis Clarke (mathematician) (born 1948), Canadian and French mathematician
 Francis Clarke (priest) (died 1910), Irish Anglican clergyman
 Francis Coningsby Hannam Clarke (1842–1893), British military officer

See also
 Francis Clark (disambiguation)
 Francis Clerke (disambiguation)
 Frank Clarke (disambiguation)
 Frank Clark (disambiguation)